Arthur A. DeFehr  (born November 10, 1942) is a Canadian businessman with investments in real estate and Palliser Furniture. He also was involved in initiating the Canadian Foodgrains Bank, LCC International University, Canadian Mennonite University, International Development Enterprises, and immigration policy including the Manitoba Provincial Nominee Program.

Early life 
DeFehr was born in 1942 in Winnipeg, Manitoba, Canada in a Mennonite family. Both his parents were refugees from the Soviet Union who came to Canada in the 1920s. He had a highly educated mother and a father who started a major furniture business.

Education 
 High school: Mennonite Brethren Collegiate
 University of Manitoba: Initial studies in science but graduated in 1964 with a Business degree. Awarded the Isbister Scholarship for academic performance.
 Goshen College: Graduated with a Bachelor of Arts in Economics.
 Harvard Business School: Graduated in 1967 with a two-year MBA. Awards included first year Baker Scholar.

Business career 
DeFehr returned to Winnipeg and the family business following his 1967 graduation from Harvard.. DeFehr became CEO of the family enterprises in 1984 and purchased the part of the business that became Palliser Furniture in 1996. Real estate represents his other major business interest.

Awards 
 Officer of the Order of Canada – 2004
 Order of Manitoba – 2011
 Honorary Doctorate of Laws – University of Manitoba 1998
 Honorary Doctorate of Laws – University College of Cape Breton – 2002
 Honorary Diploma – Red River College – 2003
 Goshen College – Alumni Award – 2011
 Entrepreneur of the Year – Manitoba Business Magazine – 2000
 Prairie Lifetime Achievement Award – Ernst and Young Entrepreneur of the Year program – 2001
 Canadian Manufacturers Hall of Fame – 2009
 Canadian Home Furnishings Alliance – Lifetime Achievement Award – 2012
 Spirit of Life Award – City of Hope (National Home Furnishings Industry Humanitarian Award)

References 

1942 births
Living people
Businesspeople from Winnipeg
Canadian Mennonites
Officers of the Order of Canada
Members of the Order of Manitoba
Harvard Business School alumni
University of Manitoba alumni
Goshen College alumni